Rzehak is a a surname of Czech origin, a transliteration of the Czech surname Řehák derived from the given name Řehoř, or Gregory (given name). Notable people with the surname include:
 Anton Rzehak (1855–1923), Moravian geologist, paleontologist and prehistorian
 Peter Rzehak (1970), Austrian former alpine skier

Czech-language surnames
Surnames from given names